Flax Bourton railway station was a railway station on the Bristol to Exeter line,  from , serving the village of Flax Bourton in North Somerset. It opened in 1860, and was closed by the Beeching Axe in 1964.

History

Opening 

The station was first opened in 1860 as Bourton  roughly half a mile from the village of Flax Bourton in Somerset. The station was renamed Flax Bourton on 1 September 1888.

The line, engineered by Isambard Kingdom Brunel, was built as  broad gauge. The line had been reconstructed as a mixed gauge line to accommodate local  gauge traffic by 1 June 1875, and broad gauge trains ceased operation on 20 May 1892.

The original station's main building was at the Bristol (east) end of the eastbound platform, built of wood. A signal box was towards the centre of the platform. The platforms were accessed by paths from both north and south, linked by a timber footbridge on brick pillars. A station master's house was built on the road above the eastbound platform.

Expansion 

Due to being in a cutting, expansion of the station was not possible, and when a need for larger facilities arose, a new station was built  further west ( from Paddington,  from Temple Meads), closer to the village. The new station opened on 2 March 1893, with the old station closing the same day. A large brick building was constructed on the eastbound platform with a large canopy, and a smaller building on the westbound platform. A covered footbridge linked the two platforms. There was a short relief line just east of the station, a siding on the west side led to a goods shed with canopies on both track and road sides, with a signal box adjacent. In 1956–7 the private Tyntesfield Sidings were laid just beyond the B3129 Station Road bridge, to serve a Ministry of Fuel and Power underground fuel depot.

Closure and dilapidation 

The station closed to passengers on 2 December 1963, a victim of the Beeching Axe. Goods traffic continued until 1 July 1964, although the private siding continued in use for some time. Of the first station all that remains is the footbridge (although the deck has been replaced with concrete), but it is just possible to make out the old paths down to the platforms. The station master's house is now in residential use.

More survives of the second station – the main building and goods shed on the eastbound platform are still in situ, albeit boarded-up and crumbling, at the end of a private residential road. The building on the westbound platform has been demolished, the platforms have been removed and the running lines slewed closer to the remaining station buildings. The relief line to the east has been removed. The fuel sidings were disconnected and the adjacent crossover points removed in February 2004.

One of the station buildings was damaged by arson on 7 April 2003.

Services 

Services were originally operated by the Bristol and Exeter Railway, continuing until the company was subsumed into the Great Western Railway in 1876. When the railways were nationalised under the Transport Act 1947, control passed to the Western Region of British Railways.

Future 

The old Tyntesfield Sidings were considered by the Mineral Industry Research Organisation as a possible railhead for the nearby Tarmac-operated limestone quarry at Stancombe. Such a plan would require a  conveyor, crossing the A370 and railway line. Reconnection to rail was listed as "feasible", but the scheme was not recommended for shortlisting, instead being listed as an "other possibility". A similar scheme was stopped in 1999 after local protests.

The Bristol to Exeter line through Flax Bourton is not currently electrified. The group Friends of Suburban Bristol Railways supports the electrification continuing to Weston, as does MP for Weston-super-Mare John Penrose.

Many local travel groups have called for the reopening of Flax Bourton station. Friends of Suburban Bristol Railways in their Autumn 2011 newsletter called for the reopening to be considered in the reletting of the Greater Western passenger franchise. Campaign for Better Transport Bristol/Bath Travel Area submitted a statement to the House of Commons Transport Committee, which was published in 2008's Delivering a Sustainable Railway. In it, they called for the reopening of Flax Bourton railway station to serve Bristol Airport. Railfuture in the South West also called for the reopening as a way to serve the Airport. North Somerset Council also suggested the reopening of Flax Bourton station to help with the sustainability of new housing in the area.

Notes

References 

Railway stations in Great Britain opened in 1860
Railway stations in Great Britain closed in 1964
Disused railway stations in Somerset
Beeching closures in England
Bristol and Exeter Railway